I Am a Dalek (stylized as I am a Dalek) is a BBC Books original novella written by Gareth Roberts and based on the long-running British science fiction television series Doctor Who. It features the Tenth Doctor and Rose. This paperback is part of the Quick Reads Initiative sponsored by the UK government, to encourage literacy. It has a similar look to BBC Books' other new series adventures, except for its much shorter word count, being a paperback and not being numbered as part of the same series. To date it is the one of only five novels based upon the revived series that have not been published in hardcover. The others are: Made of Steel, published in March 2007, Revenge of the Judoon (March 2008), The Sontaran Games (February 2009) and Code of the Krillitanes (March 2010). These four books are also part of the Quick Reads Initiative.

Synopsis

The Doctor and Rose Tyler are preparing to enjoy a visit to Earth's Moon, when they discover that the TARDIS has on its own volition, taken them instead to a small seaside town in present-day England. In this town, the dead shell of a Dalek has been discovered by archaeologists in 1st century Roman ruins on the site of a decommissioned Cold War-era military bunker.

The Doctor and Rose are separated for a time when the TARDIS dematerializes with Rose still outside the ship. The Doctor finds himself at the dig where he befriends one of the archaeologists and, upon recognizing the Dalek, attempts to disarm the dead creature by giving his new friend custody of the Dalek's gun arm.

Rose, meanwhile, witnesses a traffic accident in which a young woman named Kate is apparently killed. However, Kate proceeds to regenerate in much the same fashion as the Doctor, which causes her hair colour to change and — unknown to Rose — her intellect to increase exponentially. Along with Kate's newfound intelligence comes a confusing desire to exterminate every human on the planet, starting with her ex-boyfriend.

The Doctor and Rose eventually reunite at the dig site, where Kate reactivates the Dalek, causing it to also regenerate. Rose and the confused Kate escape, while the Doctor tries to unsuccessfully disable the revived Dalek before it can go on a killing spree. The Dalek tracks down and kills the archeologist in order to reacquire its gun arm.

Meanwhile, Kate's personality becomes more Dalek-like, and she eventually unites with the Dalek, who bargains for the use of a time travel technology, with Earth as the bargaining chip.

It is revealed that Kate is a form of Dalek-human hybrid, the result of an attempt by Daleks who came to Earth millennia earlier (because of the Time War) and injected a "Dalek Factor" into humanity. However, only a few individuals retained it in the present day.

With encouragement from Rose and the Doctor, Kate's human personality manages to reassert itself against the Dalek influence and she destroys the Dalek, returning to her pre-accident self.

Continuity
The time travel technology the Dalek demands from the Doctor is a time ring, a device last seen in the Fourth Doctor serial, Genesis of the Daleks. In the novel, the Doctor has kept the ring in an old chest, in the TARDIS. It is unknown if this is the same one as Genesis, but it is generally accepted  (due to its age, and the fact the Doctor has kept it from a previous adventure) that it is the same one (even though that time ring was apparently retrieved by the Time Lords shortly after returning the Doctor and his companions to the Nerva station in Revenge of the Cybermen).
The concept of a Dalek factor originated in the Second Doctor serial The Evil of the Daleks. Since then it has become a staple for the Doctor Who brand.
Unlike the previous Tenth Doctor novels, the exact placement of this story in the Tenth Doctor's chronology is uncertain. The Doctor Who Reference Guide places it between the episodes "Tooth and Claw" and "School Reunion" but it could also take place at any time between "The Age of Steel" and "Army of Ghosts".
The idea of a Human-Dalek fusion was later reused in "Daleks in Manhattan". Whether the Human-Dalek hybrids from this book and the episode are related is unclear. The idea reappeared in "Asylum of the Daleks".

See also

Whoniverse

References

External links

The Cloister Library - I Am a Dalek
 https://www.latimes.com/entertainment-arts/tv/story/2021-01-01/doctor-who-new-years-daleks-bbc-america

2006 British novels
2006 science fiction novels
Doctor Who novellas
British science fiction novels
Tenth Doctor novels
Dalek novels
Novels by Gareth Roberts (writer)